Meriem Oukbir (born 26 February 1991), is an Algerian actress. She is best known for the role 'Dalya' in the films Wlad Lahlal.

She graduated from the university in 2013. While in the university, she began her career as a model. In 2016, made her maiden acting role the role of Zahra in the comedy series Under supervision. Maryam achieved success as an actress due to the popular role of 'Zahra' in the series On Watch, in which she got good reactions from the public.

Filmography

References

Living people
Algerian television actresses
Algerian actresses
Algerian female models
1991 births
21st-century Algerian people